Perth Rectangular Stadium, currently branded HBF Park (under a sponsorship agreement with HBF Health Fund) and previously called Perth Oval, is a sports stadium in Perth, the capital of the Australian state of Western Australia. Located close to Perth's central business district, the stadium currently has a maximum capacity of 20,500 people for sporting events and 25,000 people for concerts, with the ground's record attendance of 32,000 people set during an Ed Sheeran concert in 2015. The land on which the stadium was built, known as Loton Park, was made a public reserve in 1904, with the main ground developed several years later.

From 1910 until 2002, it was known as Perth Oval and was the home ground of the East Perth Football Club in the West Australian Football League (WAFL). It hosted several of the competition's grand finals during that time. In 2004, the ground was redeveloped, altering it from an oval field to a rectangular field. The ground is currently home to two major professional sporting clubs: Perth Glory FC, a soccer team competing in the A-League, and the Western Force, a rugby union team playing in the Super Rugby Pacific competition. The ground is also used by the West Coast Pirates, a semi-professional rugby league team competing in the  Ball Cup, as well as for concerts.

Current use
The stadium is currently used for hosting sports events and concerts.

Sport
In sports mode the stadium has a capacity of around 20,500. Soccer club Perth Glory has played at the ground since 1996. The stadium is unusual among modern Australian stadiums for having a standing terrace at the northern end of the ground, called 'The Shed'.

The ground has hosted rugby union team Western Force since 2010. The Force's move to the stadium led to a minor redevelopment of facilities at the ground, including an increase in capacity and improved lighting.

For 2008 the stadium hosted WA Reds home matches in the Bundaberg Red Cup.

Since 2009, there have been annual NRL games played at the oval, generally as South Sydney Rabbitohs home games, with the Manly Warringah Sea Eagles joining in 2016. The stadium has housed the administrative facilities of the Western Australia Rugby League since 2003.

In 2015, the stadium hosted a 2018 FIFA World Cup qualifier between the Australia and Bangladesh, the first A-international in Perth in over a decade.

It will host matches and also to be one of the venues for the 2023 FIFA Women's World Cup.

Concerts
The capacity for concerts is now over 25,000. A record 32,000 crowd attended the Ed Sheeran concert in 2015.

History

Early history
The land on which the stadium is built was known as Loton's Paddock after the previous owner William Loton, Lord Mayor of Perth. The Paddock had been reclaimed from part of Stone's Lake, which was part of a lake system known as The Great Lakes District which included Lake Monger and Herdsman Lake.

Loton sold the land to the City of Perth in 1904 with the purpose of providing recreation for the residents of the area. After the 2004 redevelopment, part of the ground reverted to public open space and the original name, Loton Park was re-applied, to honour Loton, and Yoordgoorading, the Noongar name for the former lake.

Lacrosse was one of the main sports played on the oval from the early 1900s to the 1940s, being the home of the WA Lacrosse Association during this time. Australian rules football was also occasionally played on the oval from 1905.

In the early 1930s large white entry gates were built on the north west corner of the ground. These have since been heritage listed.

Soccer

Soccer was an early tenant at Loton Park, playing regular matches as early as 1903, when over 2,000 spectators attended a Charity Cup match between Olympic FC and Civil Service.

In 1905 the land was offered to the WA British Football Association for £2000, but the asking price was considered too high.

Perth Oval was the scene of a humiliation in 1927 when the WA state team were thrashed 11–3 by Bohemians, a team representing Czechoslovakia.

Prior to the 2004 redevelopment, Perth Oval was oval-shaped, and when Perth Glory entered the National Soccer League (NSL) in 1996, temporary stands were moved onto the pitch to get supporters closer to the action. After playing in these conditions for four years, it became apparent that the Glory would need their own rectangular stadium and after Glory's proposed redevelopment of Leederville Oval was rejected, the Town of Vincent completely overhauled the ground into a rectangular stadium.

Perth Glory are now major tenants of this stadium and continue play their home games at Perth Oval.
Perth Oval also hosted the 2014 W-League Semi-Final and Grand Final matches involving Perth Glory Women.

2015 saw the return of the Australia national soccer team to Perth after a 10-year absence, with a 5–0 2018 FIFA World Cup Qualifier win against Bangladesh on 3 September, in front of a 19,495-strong crowd. The following year on 1 September the Socceroos returned for another World Cup Qualifier against Iraq, with 18,923 in attendance.

Perth Oval has been selected to host several group stage matches of the 2023 FIFA Women's World Cup, to be hosted by Australia and New Zealand. The oval is receiving a $32 million upgrade before the tournament, which will include new LED floodlighting, upgrades of player and media facilities, pitch improvements, new player races and bench areas, and additional temporary seating for spectators.

Men's international soccer

Women's international soccer

Australian rules football

Australian rules football club East Perth Football Club moved to Perth Oval from Wellington Square in 1910, and played at the ground until 1999 except in 1940 due to a dispute with the Perth City Council over rents, and in 1988 and 1989 when the WAFL attempted an unsuccessful move to the WACA. After the Royals played their last match at the ground, they permanently moved away in 2003.

In 1956 the F.D. Book Stand was built as part of East Perth Football Club's golden jubilee celebrations. It was named after administrator Fred Book, who was instrumental in ensuring Perth Oval stayed as a sporting ground during World War II.

The ground was briefly used as a home base for East Perth's WAFL rivals West Perth and Perth. Six West Australian Football League Grand Finals were played at Perth Oval, the first being in 1912 and the last in 1935.

Cricket

Rugby union
Rugby was played at Perth Oval as early as 1905.

The ground has occasionally been used by the Western Australian Rugby Union to host state league finals matches at least as far back as 1940.

Perth Spirit played at Perth Oval during the 2007 Australian Rugby Championship.

Since 2010 the Western Force have called Perth Oval home and together with co-tenants Perth Glory, helped instigate the stadium's most recent re-development.

Rugby league
Rugby league has been an annual fixture at Perth Oval since 2009, with South Sydney Rabbitohs hosting a home game once a season until 2017 with the Manly-Warringah Sea Eagles joining them for 2016 and 2017. The biggest crowds have occurred in games involving the New Zealand Warriors. It was announced in January 2016 that the stadium would host Perth's first rugby league test match between the Australian Kangaroos and the New Zealand Kiwis on 15 October 2016.

It was also selected as a venue for the 2017 Rugby League World Cup.

In February 2020 Perth Oval hosted the NRL Nines.

List of rugby league test matches played at the Perth Oval.

The first game played at the venue was in the 1997 Super League season. The Perth-based Western Reds moved their round 4 game against the Canterbury Bulldogs to the oval due to the unavailability of their usual home ground, the WACA. On that occasion the Reds won 36–6 in what was the venue's smallest rugby league attendance (until 2017) of 7,135.

NRL games

Record attendances
The record crowd for the ground is 32,000 for the Ed Sheeran concert on 2 December 2015, overtaking the previous record of 31,997 for the last Foo Fighters concert in 2015.

The record sport attendance is 27,473, for an interstate Australian football match between Western Australia and Victoria on 6 July 1929 – which was at the time the record football crowd in Western Australian history. The highest crowd for a club match was 26,760 for the 31 May 1969 derby Australian football match between East Perth and West Perth.

The record soccer crowd for a match at the ground is 19,495, for a 2018 FIFA World Cup qualifier between the Socceroos and Bangladesh, bettering the previous record of 18,067 in the 1998–99 NSL season game between Perth Glory and South Melbourne FC.

The record rugby union crowd at the venue prior to the 2012–13 redevelopment is an estimated 22,000 in a Super Rugby 2011 Season game between the Western Force and Crusaders on 30 April 2011.

The record sports crowd at the venue since the 2012–13 redevelopment is 20,727 in a 2015 NRL season game between the South Sydney Rabbitohs and New Zealand Warriors on 6 June 2015.

Music

HBF Park has been the venue of major music concerts, including:

Additionally, in September 2020 Tame Impala performed on the pitch in the empty park amid the COVID-19 pandemic in promotion of EA Sports FIFA 21.

References

External links

Perth Glory FC
A-League Men stadiums
A-League Women stadiums
Rugby league stadiums in Australia
West Australian Football League grounds
Rugby union stadiums in Australia
East Perth Football Club
State Register of Heritage Places in the City of Vincent
Sports venues completed in 1904
Western Force
Soccer venues in Perth, Western Australia
2023 FIFA Women's World Cup stadiums